Blum Stadium was the home of Parsons College (Fairfield, Iowa) Wildcats football from 1966 through their final season in 1970.  The dedication game was a 37–7 victory over Los Angeles State on October 8, 1966.  The final game was a 10–8 victory over Wayne State (Mich.) on October 24, 1970.  Parsons overall record at Blum Stadium was 17–9.

In previous years, Parsons had played on campus at Alumni Field.  Alumni Field was re-dedicated as Johnson Field in 1947, in honor of the faculty member who led the effort to create the playing field facility in the early 1900s.  This small venue was razed in the late 1950s to make room for Fry-Thomas Fieldhouse.  This location is directly south of the Blum Stadium site, in the southeast corner of the campus.  From the late 1950s up to 1966, Parsons played their home games at Fairfield High School's stadium, which is located in the eastern section of Fairfield, just north of US Route 34.

Blum Stadium consisted of concrete seating placed along both sides of the field from back-of-endzone to back-of-endzone.  The seating was built into an earthen horseshoe that transitioned from being excavated at the northern end to build up embankment on the southern end.  The wooden pressbox was located on the western side of the stadium.  The scoreboard stood atop the earthen ridge on the north end of the stadium.  Two pre-fab sheet metal dressing rooms were located side by side at the south end of the stadium.

According to newspaper accounts of the time, one week before the dedication game, the stadium consisted of the sodded playing field, and the earthen horseshoe.  The concrete foundations for the seating had been constructed, but no seats were in place.  In the week leading up to the dedication game, the pre-cast concrete seating/walkway sections were trucked in, set into place, and wooden bench seats were bolted onto them.  The wooden pressbox was built in the few days before the game.  Also, the dressing rooms, scoreboard, goalposts and a chain link fence around the stadium were installed during this week.  Carpenters were still working on the pressbox within 40 minutes of the 1:30 pm kickoff, and sod was being placed at the same time.  In the 1967 (1966–67 schoolyear) Parsons yearbook (The Peira), the description of the dedication game refers to "Instant Blum Stadium."

After acquiring the Parsons campus in 1974, the Maharishi University of Management used the site as a soccer field/stadium up into the early 2000s, when it was demolished as a part of their program of transforming the campus along Maharishi Sthapatya Veda principles of architecture.  The concrete seats and much of their embankment were removed to "smooth out" the earthen bowl.  The playing field remains.

Photo gallery

References
Parsons College Historic Football Scores
Football Scores from Various Historical Newspapers

Game Films
Parsons Scrimmage Spring 1966 on Site of future Blum Stadium Part 1
Parsons Scrimmage Spring 1966 on Site of future Blum Stadium Part 2
1966 Parsons at Furman
1966 Pecan Bowl Game Film (Parsons in dark jerseys)
1967 Parsons at Idaho Game Film

External links
1967 college football pre-season, includes account of completion of Blum Stadium
Picture of Blum Stadium looking from north to south
Old newspaper articles
1994 satellite photo, select "DOQ" option in menu bar
Account and pictures of Parsons vs. North Dakota in 1966 Pecan Bowl
Parsons College Alma Mater and Fight Song
Blum Stadium site today

Defunct college football venues
Parsons Wildcats football
Demolished sports venues in Iowa